Trachyglanis minutus is a species of loach catfish found in the Ubangi River in the Republic of the Congo and the Democratic Republic of the Congo.  It grows to a length of 5.0 cm.

References 
 

Amphiliidae
Taxa named by George Albert Boulenger
Fish described in 1902